Boonein is an iridoid isolated from Alstonia boonei, a medicinal tree of West Africa.

References

Iridoids
Cyclopentanes